Denkmäler deutscher Tonkunst (literally "Monuments of German musical art") is a historical edition of music from Germany, covering the Baroque and Classical periods.

The edition comprises two series: the first appeared in sixty-five volumes between 1892 and 1931, and the second, which was subtitled Denkmäler der Tonkunst in Bayern (Monuments of musical art in Bavaria), in thirty-six volumes between 1900 and 1931. The first series was issued by a Prussian royal commission of celebrity musicians and musicologists in instalments through the music publishers Breitkopf & Härtel in Leipzig, and the second by the Society for the Publication of Monuments of Musical Art in Bavaria.

A parallel series of volumes on Austrian composers, Denkmäler der Tonkunst in Österreich (Monuments of musical art in Austria), was begun in 1959, and as at 2015-10-25 is in progress at one hundred and fifteen volumes.

References to these editions in this article in common with general practice use the acronyms DdT, DTB, and DTO, and to the Münchener Digitalisierungs Zentrum Digitale Bibliothek with MDZ.

Between 1957 and 1961 the First Series was revised and re-issued by the publishers under the editorship of H. J. Moser again in sixty-five volumes.

In 1962 revision of the Second Series of DdT (i.e., DBT) was begun. By 1970 three volumes (9, 20, and 22) had been revised. San Francisco Public Library lists volumes 34, and 36, with date 1962.

In 1967 the publication of a neue Folge (new series) of DdT : DBT with the same musical content was started by the Gesellschaft für Bayerische Musikgeschichte (Society for Bavarian Music History) via Breitkopf & Härtel. The DdT was dropped and the new series entitled "Denkmaeler der Tonkunst in Bayern". The editors decided on volumes of musical scores, and book-format special volumes (Sonderbände). As at 2015-10-25 twenty-four volumes of musical scores have been published, and two special volumes. Breitkopf & Härtel's catalogue refers.

The Münchener Digitalisierungszentrum (Munich Digitization Centre) of the Bayerische Staatsbibliothek (State Library of Bavaria) has published the 1892 DdT, and 1900 DBT, online.

Rationale
The genesis of DdT is indicated by the title page to Volume One: Denkmäler deutscher Tonkunst herausgegeben durch eine von der königlich Preussischen Regierung berufene Commission  (Monuments of German musical art edited by the Commission appointed by the Royal Prussian Government)

The Kingdom of Prussia was ruled at its peak by Emperor William II (1859–1941), and Chancellor Otto von Bismarck (1815–1898). After the resignation of the Chancellor in 1890, the Emperor also presided over the fall of the kingdom. The production of DdT began in 1892, and continued throughout the First World War until 1931 and nearly the start of the Third Reich (1933–1945): an example perhaps of ars longa, vita brevis. The life of DdT was largely independent of the fall of Prussia, and its significance was tempered by the changes in Europe after 1918, and after 1945. The re-evaluation of its contents in the period 1959 to 1970 may be an indication either of the lasting value of the works of older composers from a modern perspective, or of a tendency to retain nationalism in music in some degree. The philosophy of Musica Britannica may hold a similar place in England.

The value of these editions in drawing attention to music by composers who deserved recognition has been illustrated by Sir Jack Westrup.

Bismarck's thoroughness, and efficiency, were thus not limited to the Prussian Army, and the Prussian welfare state, but characteristically extended to the art of music: stepping from the particular of Bismarck's choice to the general of national identity, the expression of national identity became a characteristic throughout the wider continent of Europe during the period 1870 to 1914. For example, national feeling in Czechoslovakia, Russia, and England encouraged the fine art counterparts of folk art that achieved expression in the works of inter alia Smetana, Dvořák, Tchaikovsky, Stravinsky, Holst, and Vaughan Williams.

Within this heady prevailing mixture of aspiration, purpose, and achievement, the foreword to the First Series explains the Commission's philosophy. Die Werke hervorragender älterer deutscher Tonmeister der Kunst und Kunstwissenschaft von neuem zugänglich zu machen, ist längst als eine Aufgabe unserer Zeit erkannt worden. . . . 

Translation.——To make accessible again the works of outstanding older German musical masters of art, and of the science of art, has long been realized as a responsibility of our times. The emergence of the collected editions of the works of JOHANN SEBASTIAN BACH, HÄNDEL, SCHÜTZ, and others owes to this realization. Projects like Friedrich Chrysander's "Monuments of Musical Art", and the publications of the Society for Music Research, are wholly or at least in part dedicated to the same purpose in life.

Apart from the merit that these publications attract in themselves, they have at the same time the advantage of more clearly recognizing the difficulties that are considered by general agreement to have been overcome. Consideration of the difficulties suggests the desire for a new enterprise, which would complement the already existing volumes in print, would be compared with them, and at the same time be thought of as comprehensive, and limited: comprehensive, in that the aim of not only the full publication of the works of a single great master would be addressed; and limited, insofar as only compositions of German musicians of the XVI, XVII and XVIII century would be published.

The masters GLUCK and HAYDN may remain aüsser considered as total spending their compositions are great tasks to existing, the solution of which is only a matter of time otherwise scheduled no composer will be to exclude its Werke have a right to continue to live in the German people by historical and artistic importance. In the almost endless riches of such works but it is to call those musical masters the first publication of whom would be in prospect, because it requires preparatory work already long in progress:

(1) Composers of sacred and secular vocal music: HANS LEO HASSLER, SAMUEL SCHEIDT, JOHANN HERMANN SCHEIN, ANDREAS HAMMERSCHMIDT, MELCHIOR FRANCK, ADAM KRIEGER, JOHANN CHRISTOPH BACH (the Eisenach Bach), and JOHANN MICHAEL BACH.   

(2) Organ composers: the master of the North German organ school exclusively BUXTEHUDE; also: SAMUEL SCHEIDT, JOHANN PACHELBEL and JOHANN GOTTFRIED WALTHER.

(3) Composers for Clavier and other instruments: JOHANN JAKOB FROBERGER, JOHANN KRIEGER, JOHANN KUHNAU, JOHANN BERNHARD BACH and CARL PHILIPP EMANUEL BACH. The Royal Prussian Ministry of Culture has conceived the attainment of such a plan for the publication of "Monuments of German musical art" headed one of num berufenen Commission and support the Publishing Act Breitkopf und Härtel in Leipzig envisaged. The present sample volume should serve to further illustrate of the company. The recording, which takes the company will prevail for the follow-up and arrangement thereof. 

Berlin May 1892.

Johann Christoph Bach (1642–1703) was born in Arnstadt, and died in Eisenach. His compositions are regarded as the most important in the Bach family before Johann Sebastian Bach.

Glossary
German words and English translations with musical use in the context of DdT are given with possible interpretation below. Some words may lead to duplication of meaning.

List of volumes in Denkmäler deutscher Tonkunst. Erste Folge.
This listing is based upon visual inspection of the digital copies available at the Munich Digitization Centre

List of volumes in Denkmäler deutscher Tonkunst. Zweiter Folge.
Denkmäler deutscher Tonkunst. Zweite Folge: Denkmäler der Tonkunst in Bayern : Veröffentlicht durch die Gesellschaft zur Herausgabe von Denkmälern der Tonkunst in Bayern [Monuments of German musical art. Second series: Monuments of musical art in Bavaria : Published by the Society for the Publication of Monuments of Musical Art in Bavaria]

From Volume Twenty-six the words "unter Leitung der Adolf Sandberger" were added to the description.

Notes on editing
In the following list a forward slash "/" indicates a new line of print.

All words on the title pages of DTB are printed in capital letters. This usage has been interpreted by assignation of capital letters only to nouns, and proper names even when the words begin a new line.

For ease of reference the contents of the title pages are arranged into volume of the whole series, volume description (Jahrgang), title, publisher, and date of publication. From volume thirty-two as Dr Benno Filser Verlag arranged the title pages differently the arrangement has been followed here against the column heading.

Only from volume twenty-one did the publishers print the number of the volume in the whole series (e.g., einundzwanzigster Band der ganzen Reihe).

Minutiae of printing have been maintained: no opening bracket before vierundzwanstigster in volume twenty-four; an unascribed "I." in volume four, and an unascribed "II, 2" in volume fifteen, which are both missing from the descriptions in MDZ.

References

External links

Collected editions of classical composers
Classical music lists
German non-fiction books
Music books